Michael Krsnich (né Krznić; September 24, 1931 – April 30, 2011) was an American left fielder in Major League Baseball who played for the Milwaukee Braves during the 1960 and 1962 seasons. His older brother, Rocky Krsnich, also played in the majors from 1949 to 1953.

Born in West Allis, Wisconsin, to a Montenegrin Serb father, Mike Krsnich was one of many baseball players whose career was interrupted during Korean War conflict. He was the brother of Rocky Krsnich (1927–2019) and Nick Krsnich (b. 1928).

Krsnich played briefly for the Braves in part of two seasons. He had previously signed by the Philadelphia Phillies before landing in Milwaukee, playing mostly at outfield and as pinch-hitter in just 21 games.

Following his major league stint, Krsnich joined the Taiyo Whales of the Japanese Central League from 1963 to 1965. He slugged a .500 average in his first two years in Japan, belting 36 home runs in 1964 to finish second to the legendary Sadaharu Oh, who hit 55 homers.

Krsnich opened 1966 with the Osaka Kintetsu Buffaloes and joined the Hanshin Tigers for the last half of the 1967 season. In his five years in Japan, he hit a .265 average with a .326 on-base percentage and a slugging of .475. He also played 13 Minor league seasons between 1950 and 1969, batting .288 with 127 home runs in 1237 games.

Krsnich died in Mesquite, Nevada, at the age of 79.

Sources

External links

1931 births
2011 deaths
American expatriate baseball players in Canada
American expatriate baseball players in Japan
American expatriate baseball players in Mexico
American military personnel of the Korean War
American people of Serbian descent
Atlanta Crackers players
Baseball players from Wisconsin
Bradford Phillies players
Evansville Braves players
Hagerstown Braves players
Hanshin Tigers players
Jacksonville Braves players
Kintetsu Buffaloes players
Louisville Colonels (minor league) players
Major League Baseball first basemen
Major League Baseball left fielders
Major League Baseball third basemen
Milwaukee Braves players
Nippon Professional Baseball first basemen
Nippon Professional Baseball shortstops
Nippon Professional Baseball third basemen
Nippon Professional Baseball outfielders
Paris Lakers players
People from West Allis, Wisconsin
Petroleros de Poza Rica players
Sacramento Solons players
Sportspeople from the Milwaukee metropolitan area
Taiyō Whales players
Topeka Hawks players
Toronto Maple Leafs (International League) players
Wichita Braves players